Isabel Pass is a gap in the eastern section of the Alaska Range which serves as a corridor for the Richardson Highway about 11 miles from Paxson.

References

Mountain passes of Alaska
Landforms of Copper River Census Area, Alaska